Babupatti is a village in the Raniganj tehsil of Pratapgarh district, Uttar Pradesh state, India. Babu Patti is a variant spelling.

Notable people 
 Harivansh Rai Bachchan, Hindi peot and writer, father of actor Amitabh Bachchan.

Noted actress and Rajya Sabha MP Jaya Bachchan on 5 March 2006 inaugurated "Dr Harivansh Rai Bachchan Memorial Library" at the village.

References 

Villages in Pratapgarh district, Uttar Pradesh